Ignaz Döllinger (27 May 1770 – 14 January 1841) was a German doctor, anatomist and physiologist and one of the first professors to understand and treat medicine as a natural science.

Biography 
Ignaz Döllinger was born in 1770 in Bamberg, where his father was a professor at the university and physician to the Prince-Bishop. He commenced his studies in his native town (where he took a doctorate in 1794), continuing them in Würzburg, Pavia and Vienna before returning to Bamberg. Soon after gaining his doctorate in 1794, he became professor for physiology and general pathology in Bamberg, but was called to a professorship of anatomy and physiology at University of Würzburg in 1803 as the successor to the former city doctor, physiologist and natural philosopher Johann Joseph Dömling (1771–1803). In 1823 he moved to Munich (to the Academy, as the University was still in Landshut at this time). When the University finally moved to the capital, he transferred there. His best known students were Louis Agassiz, Karl Ernst von Baer, Lucas Schönlein, Christian Heinrich von Pander, Lorenz Oken and Philip Franz Balthasar von Siebold.

Döllinger's importance comes from his contributions to the understanding of human development and comparative anatomy, based on his knowledge in all areas of morphology and physiology. He was one of the first workers to perceive and treat medicine as a natural science – his work on the circulation of blood, secretory processes and the first stages of embryological development are exemplary here. At the same time, he was aware that simply collecting scientific facts was just as ineffective as pure speculation, and it was because of this attitude that he is considered a natural philosopher, although he never argued in favour of any extreme point of view.

He died in Munich.

References 

1770 births
1841 deaths
People from Bamberg
German anatomists
German physiologists